Rene Paul Chambellan (September 15, 1893 – November 29, 1955) was an American sculptor who specialized in architectural sculpture.  He was also one of the foremost practitioners of what was then called the "French Modern Style" and has subsequently been labeled Zig-Zag Moderne, or Art Deco. He also frequently designed in the Greco Deco style.

Life and career
Chambellan was born in West Hoboken, New Jersey (now part of Union City, New Jersey). He studied at New York University from 1912 to 1914, in Paris at the Beaux-Arts Institute of Design from 1914 to 1917 and the Académie Julian (1918-1919), as well as with sculptor Solon Borglum in New York City.  During the First World War, he was a sergeant in France with the U.S. Army.

A resident of Cliffside Park, New Jersey, Chambellan died in a nursing home in Jersey City, New Jersey.
CORRECTION: I am the grandson of Rene Chambellan and NO - he did NOT die in a nursing home in Jersey City. He succumbed to a stroke (after having several) and worked up until his death.

Selected architectural sculpture

1922-1926 – Russell Sage Foundation Building, Grosvenor Atterbury architect, (now Sage House), 122-130 East 22nd Street, New York City
1923-1924 – American Radiator Building, Howels & Hood and André Fouilhoux architects, NYC
1925 – Chicago Tribune Building, Raymond Hood architect, Chicago, Illinois
1927 – Sterling Memorial Library, James Gamble Rogers architect, Yale University, New Haven, Connecticut
– Home Savings Bank of Albany, Dennison & Hirons architects, Albany, New York
1927-1929 – Williamsburgh Savings Bank Tower, Robert Helmer of Halsey, McCormack and Helmer, architects, Brooklyn
1928 – New York Life Building, Cass Gilbert architect, NYC
– State Bank & Trust Company Building, Dennison & Hirons, architects, NYC
– Beekman Tower, John Mead Howells, architect, NYC
1929 – Chanin Building, Sloan & Robertson architects, NYC
– Stewart & Company Building, Warren & Wetmore architects, NYC
1930 – Daily News Building, Raymond Hood architect, NYC
1931 – Buffalo City Hall, Deitel, & Wade architects, Buffalo, New York
– Carew Tower, Delano & Aldrich with W.H. Ahlschlager architects, Cincinnati, Ohio
– King’s County Hospital, LeRoy P. Ward architect, NYC
– Tower, National Shrine of the Little Flower, Henry McGill architect, Royal Oak, Michigan
 – Sterling Memorial Library, James Gamble Rogers architect, New Haven, Connecticut
c.1932 – New York State Office Building, Albany, New York
1939 – Manhattan Criminal Courthouse (100 Centre Street), Harvey Wiley Corbett and Charles B. Meyers architects, NYC 1939
1940 – Airlines Building, John B. Peterkin architect, NYC
1948 – Firestone Memorial Library, O’Connor & Kilham architects, Princeton University, Princeton, New Jersey
Queens County Hospital, NYC
Naval Hospital, Beaufort, South Carolina

Other works
1921 – John Newbery Medal
c.1928 Series of five designs in cast-iron depicting historic New York City seals, for the Miller Elevated Highway
1929 – Bronze Doors, East New York Savings Bank, Holmes & Winslow architects, Brooklyn, New York
c.1930s Tritons, Nereids and Dolphins, Rockefeller Center, NYC
1937 – Bronze Doors, Hirons & Woolwine architects, Davidson County Courthouse, Nashville, Tennessee
– Caldecott Medal
1940 – John Bates Clark Medal for American Economic Association
c.1950 World War II Monument, Midland, Michigan

Gallery

References
Notes

Bibliography
Balfour, Alan. Rockefeller Center – Architecture as Theater, New York: McGraw-Hill,1978 
Kvaran, Einar Einarsson Kvaran. Architectural Sculpture of the United States, unpublished manuscript
Stern, Robert A. M.; Gilmartin, Gregory F. and Mellins, Thomas.  New York 1930 New York: Rizzoli Press, 1987

External links 

Rene Paul Chambellan - One of Art Deco's Greatest Sculptors.

1893 births
1955 deaths
American architectural sculptors
American male sculptors
People from Cliffside Park, New Jersey
People from Union City, New Jersey
Military personnel from New Jersey
Art Deco sculptors
20th-century American sculptors
National Sculpture Society members
Russell Sage Foundation
Sculptors from New Jersey
20th-century American male artists